Philip Reeve Heatley (born 5 April 1967) is a New Zealand politician. He is a member of the National Party. From 2008 until January 2013, he was a member of cabinet, holding the portfolios of Fisheries, Fisheries and Aquaculture, Energy and Resources, and Housing, before being replaced in a cabinet reshuffle by Prime Minister John Key. Heatley retired from Parliament in 2014.

Early years
Heatley was born in Whangarei. Before entering politics, Heatley completed a master's degree with Honours in Horticultural Engineering at Massey University. He has undertaken short-term study and work as a volunteer with an international relief agency on a hospital ship. He was an agricultural engineer in the dairy industry, surveying and designing farm buildings, land drainage and irrigation systems. He authored two published environmental engineering manuals. He is currently a Fellow of the Institution of Professional Engineers New Zealand (IPENZ).

Member of Parliament

In Opposition, Heatley was a member of Parliament's Primary Production Committee, Regulations Review Committee and Transport and Industrial Relations Committee and has been National's spokesman on Forestry, Fisheries, Regional Development, Early Childhood Education and Energy.

He became Minister of Housing and Minister of Fisheries in the Fifth National Government in 2008 and remained Minister of Housing and became Minister of Energy and Resources in 2011, the beginning of the Government's second term.

In 2009 he introduced the Unit Titles Bill, modernising the 1972 legislation that regulates the way apartment blocks and multi-unit developments are managed. The Act came into force in April 2010. He also introduced the Residential Tenancies Amendment Bill to update existing rental laws and extend them to cover tenants in boarding houses not previously having protection. The legislation was passed in 2010.

Following 'errors' found in his expense reports, he resigned all portfolio positions in February 2010. He was reinstated to his ministerial portfolios the following month after a report which cleared him of any deliberate wrongdoing.

In 2011 he imposed change to the way Housing New Zealand delivered state housing including introducing a 'reviewable tenancy' that put an end to a 70-year 'state house for life' principle. A one-year suspension period to prevent anti-social tenants from reapplying for a state house, measures to prevent fraud and a commitment to insulate every state house and resource third sector providers of social housing also came into force.

Heatley's fisheries portfolio role was renamed from April 2010. As Minister of Fisheries and Aquaculture, in 2010 Heatley introduced the Aquaculture Legislation Amendment Bill (No 3) to streamline consenting, help manage competing demand for coastal space, and to deliver on the Maori Commercial Aquaculture Settlement to iwi. The legislation was passed in 2011. Together with then Labour Minister, Kate Wilkinson, he initiated a Ministerial Inquiry into the operation of Foreign Charter Vessels (FCVs) in New Zealand's EEZ. This followed allegations of the failure of some FCVs to provide for proper crew working conditions and vessel safety standards. Heatley, as Minister of Fisheries and Aquaculture, was succeeded by David Carter as Minister of Primary Industries following the 2011 post-election cabinet reshuffle. The inquiry was concluded in 2012 and the Fisheries (Foreign Charter Vessels and Other Matters) Bill was tabled later that year.

In December 2011 Heatley became Minister of Energy and Resources. In 2012 he introduced the Crown Minerals (Permitting and Crown Land) Bill amending the Crown Minerals Act 1991 to 'promote', not simply manage, exploration and production of oil, gas and mineral resources. The legislation created a two-tiered permit system for the more complex, higher-return petroleum and mineral activities and the lower-return small business and hobby mineral operations. Amendments were also included in response to the report of the Royal Commission on the Pike River Coal Mine disaster. The legislation was passed in 2013. In February 2012, he introduced a new 'block offer' process for awarding oil and gas exploration permit areas across New Zealand, including in its EEZ. Blocks on offer are confirmed following consultation with iwi and local authorities and a competitive tender is undertaken to finally allocate permits. This replaced a 'priority in time' process.

In 22 January 2013 Cabinet reshuffle, Heatley lost his ministerial portfolio Energy and Resources to Simon Bridges and Housing to Nick Smith.

Post-ministerial career
On 31 January 2013 Heatley was granted the right to retain the title of The Honourable for life in recognition of his term as a Member of the Executive Council of New Zealand.
Hon Phil Heatley was a member of the Parliament's Social Services Committee (2013–2014) and its Local Government and Environment Committee (2013–2014). In early November 2013 he announced he would be retiring from politics at the 2014 general election to "move on to fresh challenges and opportunities in the private sector". In September 2015 he joined the Northland Regional Council.

References

External links
Phil Heatley MP official site
Profile at National party

|-

|-

|-

|-

1967 births
Living people
New Zealand National Party MPs
People from Whangārei
Ministers of Housing (New Zealand)
Members of the New Zealand House of Representatives
New Zealand MPs for North Island electorates
Members of the Cabinet of New Zealand
21st-century New Zealand politicians
21st-century New Zealand engineers
20th-century New Zealand engineers